The Carrie & Lowell Tour was the sixth concert tour by American recording artist Sufjan Stevens. The tour supported his seventh studio album, Carrie & Lowell (2015). The tour began in the spring of 2015. Stevens played over 100 shows in North America, Australasia and Europe.

Background
The tour was announced in January 2015, with tickets going on sale January 30, 2015. In April, shows in the Europe were announced. Following his festival appearance in Sydney, Stevens mentioned wanting to do a full tour in Australia. The dates were released in September 2015.

Critical reception
The tour was well received by concertgoers and critics. Piet Levy of the Milwaukee Journal Sentinel wrote: "But the approach was absolutely appropriate for what is clearly a deeply personal body of work, one whose sentiments of abandonment and regret and nostalgia resemble what audience members have experienced during their own complicated lives". The Atlantic'''s Spencer Kornhaber praised the concert in Washington, D.C.. He wrote: "Seeing Stevens live is like upping the contrast in a photo. Carrie & Lowell sounds much the same throughout—it's mostly acoustic, mostly percussion-free, and definitely not a jam—but in concert there are higher highs and lower lows and a wider array of sounds". The concert in Pittsburgh was attended by Scott Mervis of the Pittsburgh Post-Gazette. He stated: "Between the acoustics of Heinz Hall, a microphone he must have spent a fortune on, exquisite melodies and a voice that glides so beautifully from whisper to falsetto, it was a stunning effect. With multi-instrumentalists Casey Foubert, Dawn Landes, 'Zardok' and drummer James McAlister, it was five-person symphony blending delicate strings with moody electronics, percussion and choral vocals that built to sneaky crescendos that don’t appear on the record".

In the United Kingdom, the shows received glowing reviews, all getting five out of five stars. For the Dublin concert, Siobhán Kane of The Irish Times stated: "Atmosphere is something Stevens brings to The Helix, a sympathetic space for his show, lending itself well to his invitation to church; at one point mirrorballs and clever lighting suggests stained glass windows which, along with the confiding nature of the performance, provide a genuinely transcendental experience. Something the haunting Vesuvius, with a semblance of choreography, harnesses". During the Edinburgh festival, Charlotte Runcie of The Daily Telegraph wrote: "It was a soothing and nourishing coda after the eardrum-bursting swoops earlier in the night. From sublime to fragile, sombre to beautiful, and universal to intimate, this was an exhilarating concert of perfect balance, with Stevens the best he has ever been". For the London show, David Smyth from the London Evening Standard'' wrote: "Stevens is always capable of making beautiful, emotional acoustic music but prone to eccentric projects such as collections about Christmas or a Brooklyn freeway — and the still, quiet anguish of his new material is devastating. During the main body of the performance he did not speak between songs. The repeated refrain of 'Fourth of July' — 'We're all gonna die' — could not have been clearer".

Opening acts

Cold Specks 
Little Scream 
Moses Sumney 
Helado Negro 
Gallant 
Madisen Ward and the Mama Bear 
Mina Tindle 
Basia Bulat 
Austra 
Naomi Shelton & the Gospel Queens 
Dawn Landes 

Landes also performed as part of Stevens's backing band.

Example Setlist
The following setlist was obtained from the June 3, 2015 concert, held at the Dorothy Chandler Pavilion in Los Angeles, California. It does not represent all concerts for the duration of the tour. 
"Redford (For Yia-Yia & Pappou)"
"Death with Dignity"
"Should Have Known Better"
"Drawn to the Blood"
"All of Me Wants All of You"
"Eugene"
"John My Beloved"
"The Only Thing"
"Fourth of July"
"No Shade in the Shadow of the Cross"
"Carrie & Lowell"
"The Owl and the Tanager"
"In the Devil's Territory"
"The Dress Looks Nice on You"
"To Be Alone with You"
"Futile Devices"
"Casimir Pulaski Day"
"Blue Bucket of Gold"
Encore
"Concerning the UFO Sighting near Highland, Illinois"
"The Predatory Wasp of the Palisades Is Out to Get Us!"
"Chicago"

Tour dates

Festivals and other miscellaneous performances

Vivid Live
Eaux Claires Music & Arts Festival
Newport Folk Festival
Rocky Mountain Folks Festival
Edinburgh International Festival
End of the Road Festival
New Zealand Festival
Auckland Art Festival

Box office score data

Personnel
Production & Lighting Designer: Marc Janowitz 
Content Designer: Josh Higgason
Lighting Director: Jason Rothberg

Band
Guitar: Dawn Landes
Bass guitar: Casey Foubert
Drums: James McAlister
Keyboards: Steve Moore

References

2015 concert tours
2016 concert tours
Sufjan Stevens